Fairfield is a suburban city located in Butler county in the U.S. state of Ohio.  Fairfield is located approximately 25 miles north of Cincinnati and is situated on the east bank of the Great Miami River.  The population was 42,623 as of the 2020 Census.  Incorporated in 1955 from portions of Fairfield Township, it includes the former hamlets of Symmes Corner, Fair Play, Furmandale, and Stockton. The Fairfield City School District is one of the largest in Ohio and serves both the City of Fairfield and Fairfield Township.

History

Early history
Prior to European settlement the Fairfield area was home to several Indian tribes, most prominently the Shawnee and the Miami.  The prehistoric Hopewell and Adena peoples constructed numerous earthworks around the city, though most were unwittingly removed by early settlers in order to accommodate farm fields.

The area that is now Fairfield was part of the original Symmes Purchase.  Also known as the Miami Purchase, the region was acquired by Judge John Cleves Symmes from the Continental Congress in 1788 and included much of the land between the Little Miami and Great Miami rivers that became the present day counties of Hamilton, Butler, and Warren.

As the area was settled hamlets developed to serve the surrounding countryside.  Judge Symmes' great-nephew, Celadon Symmes, was the founder and first settler of Symmes Corner.  Located at the intersection of Pleasant Avenue and Nilles Road it now serves as Fairfield's town center.  
The hamlet of Fair Play was located on the east bank of the Great Miami River.  It was known for its mills, including Ohio's first paper mill.   The community was destroyed by a flood in the late 1800s.  Today the Miami Chapel Cemetery and the Fair Play School are some of the few remaining vestiges of the village.

In the 1850s, the Cincinnati, Hamilton & Dayton Railway (today CSX) was extended through Fairfield, fostering the development of several communities.  The villages of Schencks Station and Stockton were established along the rail line.  Schencks Station was located near the present-day intersection of Symmes Road and State Route 4 and was named for local landowner Aaron Schenck.  Stockton could be found at the crossroads of State Route 4 and Seward Road.  Originally known as Jones Station, the village provided area farms with necessities including a smithy, a general store, churches, and a school.  In between the two communities was the village of Furmandale; also known as Schnapstown or Snaptown.  Located at the current intersection of Winton and Nilles roads, the community took its name from Nathaniel Furman who operated a private school for girls within the community. A few miles to the east of these communities was the Miami-Erie Canal which, prior to the arrival of the railroad, enabled early settlers to move their commodities to market.

Growth and incorporation
Fairfield remained a quiet, primarily agricultural community until the mid-20th century.  As the City of Hamilton grew its industry expanded south into present day Fairfield.  Fisher Body, a manufacturing division of General Motors, established a plant at the northeast corner of State Route 4 and Symmes Road near the location of what was Schencks Station.  During the same timeframe Fairfield started to experience residential growth, initially as a southern suburb of Hamilton.  In 1954 a group of citizens wishing to avoid annexation into Hamilton organized an incorporation campaign.  The initial petition was to create a municipal corporation from Fairfield Township in its entirety. A referendum was held in April 1954 with incorporation failing by a vote of 1,219 to 831.  A renewed effort focused on those precincts that voted affirmatively.  A second referendum was held in July 1954 with incorporation winning by a vote of 738 to 216.  Fairfield was established as a statutory village in 1955 with a mayor-council form of government.

The next 30 years represented a period of rapid growth for the community.  By 1960 the village had exceeded a population of 5,000 and was reclassified as a statutory city.  The Interstate 275 beltway was constructed around Cincinnati in the late 1970s.  The new road provided easy access to Fairfield from the northern Cincinnati suburbs, thus providing an additional high quality transportation route.  This, in turn, drove substantial commercial and residential investment in the community.

Growing pains and stabilization
The city's form-of-government was a subject of debate almost from its inception.  In 1961 a charter commission was formed to study the issue.  After due consideration the commission recommended adoption of a charter with the council-administrator form of government, but the initiative was rejected by the voters.   The question resurfaced in 1971, but did not progress beyond council conversations.  In 1976 the issue gained momentum with form-of-government becoming an issue in council campaigns.  In 1978 a charter commission was established and charged with framing a charter that would establish a council-administrator form-of-government.  The city's second charter commission spent eight months researching the charters of various Ohio communities.  A referendum was held on June 5, 1979, in which the issue was approved by a vote of 1,423 to 1,265.  The council-administrator (later council-manager) form went into effect on January 1, 1980.

General Motors announced that the Hamilton-Fairfield Chevrolet Pontiac Canada Group, known as the Fisher Body plant, would be phased out in the first quarter of 1989. The effect of the plant closing was a loss of 2,500 jobs and 28 percent of the city's income tax revenue, amounting to $1.7 million.

The city regained economic balance in the 1990s and experienced wide, diverse business development. With a population of 39,729 at the beginning of 1990, the city's explosive population growth had begun to slow, allowing it to focus on quality development of remaining residential and commercial areas. During this time, Fairfield updated and expanded its sanitary sewers, established detention basins for better stormwater control, continued to address road improvements, and established a community center.

In 1995, Fairfield withdraw from Fairfield, Union, and Springfield townships via a paper township called "Heritage Township", reusing a name from a previous failed attempt to incorporate Symmes and Deerfield townships as a city.

Geography
The Butler County line serves as Fairfield's southern corporate boundary with a small portion of the City extending into Hamilton County. This portion contains no population. The city is bounded on the north by the City of Hamilton and the eponymously named Fairfield Township; the east by West Chester and Fairfield townships; the south by the cities of Springdale and Forest Park as well as Springfield and Colerain townships; and on the west by Fairfield and Ross townships. 
The city is bisected by a major rail line and is served by several interstate, federal and state highways which provide for excellent access.  This transportation infrastructure has contributed greatly to Fairfield's economic success.

Most of Fairfield sits on top of the Great Miami Buried Valley Aquifer; one of the largest underground reservoirs in the Midwest.  The aquifer provides a clean and safe source of drinking water for communities up and down the course of the Great Miami River.  The cities of Fairfield, Hamilton and Cincinnati operate water production facilities within Fairfield corporate boundaries; all of which draw from the aquifer.

Demographics

2010 census
As of the census</ref> of 2010, there were 42,510 people, 17,415 households, and 11,372 families residing in the city. The racial makeup of the city was 79.0% White, 12.8% African American, 0.3% Native American, 2.4% Asian, 0.1% Pacific Islander, 3.0% from other races, and 2.4% from two or more races. Hispanic or Latino of any race were 5.5% of the population.

There were 17,415 households, of which 32.1% had children under the age of 18 living with them, 47.2% were married couples living together, 13.1% had a female householder with no husband present, 4.9% had a male householder with no wife present, and 34.7% were non-families. 28.7% of all households were made up of individuals, and 9.3% had someone living alone who was 65 years of age or older. The average household size was 2.41 and the average family size was 2.97.

The median age in the city was 38.3 years. 23.2% of residents were under the age of 18; 8.6% were between the ages of 18 and 24; 27.4% were from 25 to 44; 28% were from 45 to 64; and 13% were 65 years of age or older. The gender makeup of the city was 48.2% male and 51.8% female.

2020 census
As of the census of 2020, there were 44,907 people, and 19,030 households. The racial makeup of the city was 64.8% White, 17.5% African American, 0.4% Native American, 5.9% Asian, 0.1% Pacific Islander, 4.5% from other races, and 6.7% from two or more races. Hispanic or Latino of any race were 8.0% of the population.

Government
The City of Fairfield is a charter municipality and operates under the council-manager form of government, combining the strong political leadership of elected officials with the professional expertise of an appointed city manager.  Legislative authority under this form of government is vested in City Council, the body that is chosen by the electorate. Council hires the manager to serve as the city's full-time chief executive officer. Fairfield City Council consists of seven members, three of who are elected at-large with the remainder elected by ward. Council members serve staggered, four-year terms with the ward members running together followed two years later by the at-large members and the Mayor.  The Mayor, who is directly elected and also serves a four-year term, acts as the official and ceremonial head of the government and presides over all meetings of Council. Mayoral duties include the right to introduce legislation and to take part in discussion of all matters before Council with the right to vote in the event of a tie.  The Mayor appoints the chairs of the various council committees and issues official proclamations.  Council, in addition to appointing the city manager and passing legislation, approves the annual operating, capital and tax budgets, contracts in the city's name, levies taxes, appoints board and commission members, and appoints the law director and the clerk of council.

The city manager is responsible for the day-to-day operations of the city, implements Council action, hires and oversees the staff, prepares and implements the annual operating and capital budgets and keeps the elected officials advised of the city's financial sustainability.

The Fairfield Municipal Court is part of the city from a budgetary perspective, but otherwise operates as a completely autonomous agency.  Municipal court judges in Ohio are elected to six-year terms on a nonpartisan judicial ballot.

Fairfield typically votes for Republican political candidates, though it has narrowed slightly in recent elections. Donald Trump received 12,041 (55.3%) votes to Joe Biden's 9,370 (43.1%) in the 2020 United States Presidential Election.

Economy
Fairfield has a highly diversified economy without a dominant industry, though two of the city's top employers are insurance companies. The corporate headquarters of insurance company Cincinnati Financial is located in Fairfield.

Jungle Jim's International Market is a regional tourism destination featuring food and beverage items from all over the world.  Jim Boniminio started the market in 1974 as a fruit stand.  A reluctant planning commission approved his request on the condition that he would ultimately construct a permanent storefront. Today Jungle Jim's International Market has 50,000 weekly shoppers and annual sales of nearly $100 million.

Top employers
As of March 2017, Fairfield's largest employers were:

Education

Fairfield City School District operates Fairfield High School as well as the Fairfield Freshmen School, two middle schools and six elementary schools.  Parochial education options include Sacred Heart of Jesus School, Stephen T. Badin High School and Cincinnati Christian schools.  A branch campus of Miami University is located a few miles north of Fairfield in the City of Hamilton. The Fairfield Lane Library is a branch of the Lane Public Library system.

Recreation
Fairfield operates an extensive parks and recreation system with over 500 acres of parkland.  Harbin Park is the city's largest at 230 acres.  It offers shelter rentals, a large playground, mountain bike trails, a paved trail for walking and biking, basketball and pickleball courts and a soccer field.  It annually hosts the Cincinnati Cyclocross; a cycling competition spread over three days and three Greater Cincinnati communities.  Harbin also plays host to the city's Red White & Kaboom fireworks show held annually on July 3 in celebration of Independence Day.  Marsh Lake Park was recently acquired from the Martin–Marietta company.  The city had, since the early 1990s, leased the eastern portion of the property from Martin–Marietta.  Per the terms of an agreement between the city and the company the property was deeded to Fairfield upon the cessation of mining operations in 2017.  The park is one of the system's crown jewels with a 60-acre quarry lake that is regularly stocked with fish.  Kayaks and other non-motorized watercraft will make their debut on the lake in the summer of 2019.  Marsh Lake Park totals 220 acres, though much of it remains passive and undeveloped.  Huffman Park is one of the city's newest recreational facilities.  It was donated, developed and dedicated in 2012 in memory of Fairfield residents Anna and Harold Huffman who owned and lived on the property for more than 50 years.  Funding for the development of the park was provided by the Anna & Harold W. Huffman Foundation.  It promotes ecology with plantings of native species and a prairie that provides wildlife habitat.

In addition to the extensive park acreage, city facilities include the Community Arts Center with a 250-seat theater, an art gallery offering rotating exhibits, a senior center and a community room that can be rented for weddings, anniversaries and corporate events; the fully restored 1817 Elisha Morgan Mansion; and the Village Green Amphitheater that hosts the seasonal Groovin' on the Green Concert Series, 4th Friday Concert Series and the Village Green Farmer's Market.  The city operates two municipal golf courses and an aquatic center.  The Fairfield Greens South Trace is a par 70 championship course that plays 6,246 yards with 5 par 3 holes, 10 par 4 holes, and 3 par 5 holes. The course features bentgrass fairways, large undulating greens, and numerous water hazards and bunkers. Fairfield Greens North Trace is an executive 9-hole course. The 1,885 yards course is par 31, with 4 par 4 holes and 5 par 3 holes. Outings, tournaments, and weekly leagues are offered and available to the public.

The Miracle League Fields at Hatton Park are operated by the Joe Nuxhall Foundation.  The facility was the dream of legendary Cincinnati Reds pitcher and broadcaster Joe Nuxhall who lived in Fairfield for much of his life and raised his family here.  The facility offers two baseball diamonds featuring rubberized playing surfaces that accommodate children and adults with disabilities.

Fairfield is home to Cincinnati Gymnastics Academy, one of the nation's top elite gymnastics program, which has coached various Olympians. The facility is owned by Mary Lee Tracy.

Notable people
Tom Segura, Stand Up Comedian who was born in Fairfield and lived there until he was 9
Rayne Johnson, country singer
Joe Nuxhall, Cincinnati Reds player and announcer
Angelo Dawkins, WWE wrestler. Part of the wwe tag team The Street Profits.
Jackson Carman, Cincinnati Bengals player

References

Further reading
Bert S. Barlow, W.H. Todhunter, Stephen D. Cone, Joseph J. Pater, and Frederick Schneider, eds.  Centennial History of Butler County, Ohio. Hamilton, Ohio:  B.F. Bowen, 1905.
Jim Blount.  The 1900s:  100 Years In the History of Butler County, Ohio. Hamilton, Ohio:  Past Present Press, 2000.
Butler County Engineer's Office.  Butler County Official Transportation Map, 2003. Fairfield Township, Butler County, Ohio:  The Office, 2003.
A History and Biographical Cyclopaedia of Butler County, Ohio with Illustrations and Sketches of Its Representative Men and Pioneers. Cincinnati, Ohio:  Western Biographical Publishing Company, 1882.
Ohio. Secretary of State.  The Ohio municipal and township roster, 2002–2003. Columbus, Ohio:  The Secretary, 2003.
History of Fairfield.  City of Fairfield Website, 2010.
 The Joe Nuxhall Miracle League Fields at Hatton Park. City of Fairfield Website, 2012.
 Life, Well Run Fairfield. The City of Fairfield has produced a video that is to assist the city in its residential retention and economic development initiatives. City of Fairfield Website, 2013.

External links

City of Fairfield Official Website
Fairfield City Schools
Journal News—Most local daily newspaper
Fairfield Echo—Local weekly newspaper

 
Cities in Ohio
Cities in Butler County, Ohio
Cities in Hamilton County, Ohio
1955 establishments in Ohio